Drain is a creator-owned comic, written  C. B. Cebulski and painted by Sana Takeda. It was published by American company Image Comics in 2006–2008, for a total of six issues, collected in a  trade paperback in 2008.

Plot
Chinatsu, a vampiress from Japan, looks for her family's killer, and also her vampire sire. She mercilessly searches throughout many time periods and centuries in order to exact her revenge.

Collected editions
A trade paperback was published in May 2008.

References

Sources

2006 comics debuts
2008 comics endings
Image Comics vampires